Josef Buemberger (19 December 1904 – 20 May 2001) was an Austrian wrestler. He competed in the men's Greco-Roman bantamweight at the 1936 Summer Olympics.

References

External links
 

1904 births
2001 deaths
Austrian male sport wrestlers
Olympic wrestlers of Austria
Wrestlers at the 1936 Summer Olympics
Sportspeople from Innsbruck